The 2007 Churchill Cup was held from May 18 to June 2, 2007. It was the fifth year of the Churchill Cup. Six rugby union teams took part: Canada, England Saxons, Ireland A, New Zealand Māori, Scotland A, and the USA.

Format

The teams were split into two pools of three teams each. The winners of the two pools moved on to compete in the overall final, while the two runners-up competed for the Plate, and the two bottom-placed teams contested the Bowl. All of the finals were played on 2 June 2007 at Twickenham.

2007 was the first occasion where the competition was played outside of North America. This was because many players were to be in Europe ahead of the Rugby World Cup.

Results

USA Pool

Canada Pool

Finals

Bowl Final

Plate Final

Cup Final

See also
 Churchill Cup

References

External links
 Churchill Cup official site

2007
2007 rugby union tournaments for national teams
International rugby union competitions hosted by England
2006–07 in English rugby union
2006–07 in Irish rugby union
2006–07 in Scottish rugby union
2007 in New Zealand rugby union
2007 in American rugby union
2007 in Canadian rugby union